Crichtonsaurus (meaning "Crichton's lizard") is a genus of herbivorous ankylosaurid dinosaur that lived during the Late Cretaceous in what is now China. It was named after Michael Crichton, the author of the dinosaur novel Jurassic Park. A sister taxon, C. benxiensis, was discovered in 2007, but this species is now identified as a separate genus, Crichtonpelta.

History
 
The first fossils of the genus were discovered in 1999 in the Sunjiawan Formation of Xiafuxiang, near Beipiao in Liaoning Province, China. It was named and described by Dong Zhiming of the Institute of Vertebrate Paleontology and Paleoanthropology of the Chinese Academy of Sciences in 2002. The type species is Crichtonsaurus bohlini. The generic name is in honor of Michael Crichton, American author whose novels include Jurassic Park, The Andromeda Strain and others. The specific name honours Birger Bohlin, a Swedish paleontologist who during the 1930s took part in several paleontological expeditions to China. He described numerous Chinese ankylosaurs. As well as his work on dinosaurs and prehistoric mammals, Bohlin was part of the group that established the existence of Peking Man.

The holotype, IVPP V12745, was found in a layer of the Sunjiawan Formation dating from the Cenomanian-Turonian. It consists of a left lower jaw with three preserved teeth. Additionally, two specimens have been referred: IVPP V12746, consisting of two neck vertebrae and a back vertebra; and LPM 101, a partial postcranial skeleton including four sacral vertebrae, seven tail vertebrae. a shoulder blade, a coracoid, a humerus, a thighbone, foot bones, a cervical halfring and osteoderms. In 2014, Victoria Arbour pointed out that the referral of the additional specimens could not be justified because of a lack of overlapping material. She also failed to find any unique traits in the holotype itself, concluding that Crichtonsaurus bohlini was a nomen dubium.

The specimens referred to Crichtonsaurus bohlini are rather small. In 2010, Gregory S. Paul estimated their body length at 3.5 metres, their weight at half a tonne.

As of 2014, Crichtonsaurus bohlini is one of four known ankylosaur species in Liaoning Province.

Crichtonsaurus bohlini was placed in the Ankylosauridae and was a likely member of the Ankylosaurinae.

Description 
A terrestrial quadruped, the Crichtonsaurus specimen was squat, as seen in the short length of the humerus and femur bones. As a member of the order Ornithschia, the species had a backwards-facing pelvis, similar to that of birds.  Dong describes notches near the base of the species' teeth. Crichtonsaurus was a genus of armored dinosaurs, but it is unknown if the species possessed a tail club, which may have been a feature exclusive to the subfamily Ankylosaurinae.

Misassigned species
A second species, Crichtonsaurus benxiensis, was named by Lü Junchang, Ji Qiang, Gao Yubo and Li Zhixin in 2007. The specific name refers to the Benxi Geological Museum. The holotype, BXGMV0012, was discovered in the same early Late Cretaceous-age (Cenomanian-Turonian) Sunjiawan Formation of Beipiao, Liaoning, as the type species. It consists of a complete skull. Additionally, specimen BXGMV0012-1 has been referred, a partial skeleton lacking the skull, found at the same location. Also, according to Arbour, a skeleton displayed at the Sihetun Fossil Museum under the name of C. bohlini, probably belongs to C. benxiensis. Paul suggested C. benxiensis were a junior synonym of C. bohlini. However, apart from indicating C. bohlini as a dubious species to which no other species can be justifiably seen as identical, Arbour established diagnostic differences between the shoulder blades of BXGMV0012-1 and LPM 101, so two ankylosaurid taxa seem to be present in the formation. Based upon her conclusion that C. bohlini was a nomen dubium, Arbour suggested a new generic name for the second species: Crichtonpelta, for the time being an invalid nomen ex dissertatione. However, in 2015, the name was validly published and it was officially separated from the dubious type species C. bohlini.

See also
 Timeline of ankylosaur research

References

Late Cretaceous dinosaurs of Asia
Ankylosaurids
Nomina dubia
Fossil taxa described in 2002
Taxa named by Dong Zhiming
Ornithischian genera